Nilshahr (also Romanized as Nīlshahr; formerly, Nilabad also Romanized as Nīlābād) is a city in Bujgan District, Torbat-e Jam County, Razavi Khorasan Province, Iran. At the 2006 census, its population was 6,674, in 1,467 families.

References 

Populated places in Torbat-e Jam County
Cities in Razavi Khorasan Province